The 1947 Pau Grand Prix was a non-championship Formula One motor race held on 4 April 1947 at the Pau circuit, in Pau, Pyrénées-Atlantiques, France. The Grand Prix was won by Nello Pagani, driving with the Maserati 4CL. Pierre Levegh finished second and Henri Louveau third.

Classification

Race

References

Pau Grand Prix
Pau
Pau Grand Prix
Pau Grand Prix